Carolla is a surname. Notable people with the surname include:

 Adam Carolla (born 1964), American radio personality, comedian, actor, and podcaster
 Gary Carolla, band member of Centory
 Sylvestro Carolla (1896–1970), Italian-American mob boss

See also

Carolle